Cheiroglossa is a genus of fern in the family Ophioglossaceae, subfamily Ophioglossoideae, with two species. Although recognized as a separate genus in the Pteridophyte Phylogeny Group classification of 2016 (PPG I), other sources regard it as a synonym of the genus Ophioglossum.

Species
, the Checklist of Ferns and Lycophytes of the World accepts two species:
Cheiroglossa malgassica (C.Chr.) Pic.Serm.
Cheiroglossa palmata (L.) Presl

References

Ophioglossaceae
Fern genera